Maja e Këndrevicës is a mountain in Gjirokastër County, southern Albania. It is 15 km west of the town Tepelenë and 36 km southeast of the city Vlorë. At 2,121 m elevation, it is the highest point of the mountain range Mali i Gribës, which stretches between the valleys of the rivers Vjosë and Shushicë.

See also
 List of European ultra prominent peaks

References

External links
 "Maja e Kendrevicës, Albania" on Peakbagger

Mountains of Albania